Htay Ngwe (born 10 August 1970) is a Burmese politician and former political prisoner currently serving as a Pyithu Hluttaw MP for Myaung Constituency. He is a member of the National League for Democracy.

Early life and education
Htay Ngwe was born on 10 August 1970 in Myaung Township, Myanmar. He graduated with B.com from Yangon Institute of Economics. His former work is farmer.

Political career
He is a member of the National League for Democracy. In the 2015 Myanmar general election, he was elected as a Pyithu Hluttaw MP and elected representative from the Myaung parliamentary constituency.

References

Living people
1970 births
National League for Democracy politicians
Members of Pyithu Hluttaw
People from Sagaing Region